Yao Jie (born 10 April 1977) is a Chinese-born badminton player who now resides in the Netherlands.

Yao is one of a number of badminton players who have emigrated from China, in part, because the depth of badminton talent in that country has made it difficult for them to be selected for major international competitions. Prior to her move to the Netherlands, she won the BWF World Junior Championships in girls' doubles with Liu Lu in 1994 at Kuala Lumpur, Malaysia, and helps the Chinese national women's team clinched a gold medal at the 1997 East Asian Games. But her passion was for the ladies singles event.

Since moving to the Netherlands Yao Jie has won the women's singles event 4 times at the Dutch Open (2003, 2008, 2009 & 2011), she won the Thailand Open twice (2004, 2005), and the biennial European Championships once (2002), and a high number of 11 Dutch National Championships. Nine times the Dutch crown in singles and twice in doubles. She was also a 3-times European bronze medalist in the 2004, 2006 European Badminton Championships and 2012 European Badminton Championships. She won the Velo Dutch International twice, in 2001 beating Mia Audina 9–11, 11–1, 13–10 and in 2012 beating Malaysian Sonia Su Ya Cheah 19–21, 21–9, 21–12 in the final. She also won the Italian International in 2011 beating Bulgarian Petya Nedelcheva in the final 21–11, 21–17 and won the Finnish International Open in 2012 beating Canadian Michelle Li 22–20, 21–19. Yao Jie was a runner-up to Zhang Ning at the China Open in 2006, runner-up to Juliane Schenk of Germany at the 2010 Dutch Open, runner-up to Li Xuerui of China at the 2011 Bitburger Open Grand Prix Gold and runner-up to Juliane Schenk at the 2012 Bitburger Open Grand Prix Gold.

Her performances at 2004 Olympic Games and at recent BWF World Championships have not been among her strongest. She was eliminated in the round of 16 at the Athens Games by Hong Kong's Wang Chen and has proceeded no farther than that round in any of her World Championship appearances. A big disappointment was her non participating at the 2008 Olympic Games in her native China, despite being qualified by the international norm, but not by the more stricter Dutch qualifying norm. In January 2009 Yao Jie married Dutch player Eric Pang.

In March 2011 Yao Jie was part of the Dutch Fource team, together with Dutch top players Dicky Palyama, Judith Meulendijks and Eric Pang. This team was formed as a result of a conflict with the Nederlandse Badminton Bond sponsored by Yonex, and these four players were non Yonex sponsored players, Yao Jie playing for sponsor Carlton. The conflict heightened in 2011 when these four non Yonex sponsored players were not included in the National squad to play the European Team Championships in Amsterdam. Despite all these juridical sponsor wranglings, Yao Jie managed to qualify for the London Olympics. At the 2012 Olympic Games in the Women's Singles Yao Jie won Group F by beating Akvilė Stapušaitytė of Lithuania 21–16, 21–7 and Ragna Ingólfsdóttir of Iceland 21–12, 25–23. After the group stage, in the knock-out stage round of 16 Yao Jie lost to Saina Nehwal of India 14–21, 16–21. Saina later progressed to win India's first Olympic badminton medal, a bronze.

Nowadays Yao Jie has her own Badminton Academy at her hometown Wuhan in China and is ambassador for Dutch Badminton in sports and cultural exchanges between the Netherlands and China.

Achievements

World Cup 
Women's singles

European Championships 
Women's singles

World Junior Championships 
Girls' doubles

Mixed doubles

BWF Grand Prix 
The BWF Grand Prix had two levels, the Grand Prix and Grand Prix Gold. It was a series of badminton tournaments sanctioned by the Badminton World Federation (BWF) and played between 2007 and 2017. The World Badminton Grand Prix was sanctioned by the International Badminton Federation from 1983 to 2006.

Women's singles

  BWF Grand Prix Gold tournament
  IBF/BWF Grand Prix tournament

BWF International Challenge/Series 
Women's singles

  BWF International Challenge tournament
  IBF International tournament

Record Against Selected Opponents
Includes results from all competitions against Super Series finalists, World Championship semifinalists, Olympic quarterfinalists, and all Olympic opponents.

  Petya Nedelcheva 7–4
  Gong Ruina 0–2
  Gong Zhichao 0–1
  Jiang Yanjiao 0–10
  Li Xuerui 0–2
  Liu Xin 1–0
  Lu Lan 1–3
  Wang Lin 0–2
  Wang Shixian 0–3
  Wang Xin 0–2
  Wang Yihan 1–3
  Xie Xingfang 2–4
  Ye Zhaoying 0–1
  Zhang Ning 3–8
  Zhu Lin 1–2
  Cheng Shao-chieh 1–2
  Tai Tzu-ying 1–1
  Tine Baun 5–3
  Camilla Martin 1–4
  Tracey Hallam 3–0
  Pi Hongyan 3–12
  Juliane Schenk 2–4
  Xu Huaiwen 3–6
  Wang Chen 0–1
  Yip Pui Yin 3–6
  Zhou Mi 0–7
  Ragna Ingólfsdóttir 1–0
  Saina Nehwal 2–4
  Maria Kristin Yulianti 0–2
  Eriko Hirose 2–4
  Sayaka Sato 1–0
  Shizuka Uchida 2–0
  Bae Youn-joo 1–4
  Sung Ji-hyun 1–4
  Akvilė Stapušaitytė 1–0
  Mia Audina 2–2
  Wong Mew Choo 2–0
  Jiang Yanmei 1–0
  Carolina Marín 1–1
  Porntip Buranaprasertsuk 0–1
  Ratchanok Intanon 0–3

References

External links
 

1977 births
Living people
Badminton players at the 2004 Summer Olympics
Badminton players at the 2012 Summer Olympics
Badminton players from Wuhan
Chinese female badminton players
Dutch female badminton players
Chinese emigrants to the Netherlands
Naturalised citizens of the Netherlands
Olympic badminton players of the Netherlands